{{Infobox film
| name           = Big B
| image          = Big B film poster.jpg
| caption        = Theatrical release poster
| director       = Amal Neerad
| based_on       = Four Brothers (film)
| producer       = 
| writer         = 
| starring       = 
| music          = {{ubl|Score:Gopi Sundar|Songs:Alphons Joseph}}
| studio         = Marikar Films
| distributor    = Anto Joseph Film Company
| released       = 
| cinematography = Sameer Thahir
| editing        = Vivek Harshan
| country        = India
| runtime        = 130 minutes
| language       = Malayalam
| budget         = 
| gross          = 
}}Big B' (short form of Big Brother) is a 2007 Indian Malayalam-language neo-noir action thriller film co-written and directed by Amal Neerad, starring Mammootty in the lead role with an ensemble cast including  Manoj K. Jayan, Bala, Sumit Naval, Mamtha Mohandas, Nafisa Ali, Pasupathy,  Shereveer Vakil, Innocent and Vijayaraghavan in supporting roles. The cinematography was done by Sameer Thahir, songs were composed by Alphonse Joseph and background score by Gopi Sundar. 

It is heavily inspired from the 2005 Hollywood film Four Brothers. Big B is considered as a pathbreaking film in the history of Malayalam cinema, which introduced a new style of making and has later attained a huge cult following. A sequel titled Bilal was announced by Amal Neerad on 17 November 2017 and is in pre-production.

 Plot 
The plot begins with the cold-blooded murder of Mary John Kurishingal. Her adopted sons arrive for her funeral from various places: Bilal John Kurishingal- a gangster, Eddy John kurishingal- a hotel owner, Murugan John Kurishingal – an action choreographer in film industry and Bijo- a student. The brothers take it upon themselves to unearth the mystery behind Mary's murder. Murugan is in love with Rimy, the daughter of Tommy Parekkadan, a happy-go-drunkard, who is against their relationship. Bilal starts meeting his old friends and contacts in the Kochi underworld to receive information about the killers. 

They piece the evidence together and find out that the murder was committed by two professional assassins from Mumbai. Balaji Shakthivel, an upright ACP, along with CI George are put in charge of Mary's murder case, who begins the investigation, but cannot fetch any evidence to prove anything related. They soon find out that the murder was one of the many meticulously planned operations, aimed to check the teacher's intrusions into unlawful exporting of children from Kochi. The unlawful operations are actually handled by Mayor and his henchman, an underworld don called Sayippu Tony. 

Bilal and his brothers takes up arms to avenge the murder. Meanwhile, Bilal makes Tommy accept the relationship between Murugan and Rimy. One night, Bijo gets killed by Tony's henchmen. However, Bilal shoots one of the henchmen and learns that Tony is the brain behind the series of crimes. Later, Tony kills Shakthivel and warns the Mayor to obey his instructions. Bilal orders Eddy and Murugan to talk to Tony for knowing his demands. Pandi Asi, one of Tony's men joins Bilal and his brothers as he seeks vengeance on Tony, where they also become successful in keeping George (who was Tony's sidekick) on their side. Bilal threatens Mayor that he will expose his corruptive plans to the whole media, which causes the Mayor to shoot and kill himself. George files this as a suicide in order to save Bilal from the case. 

Eddy and Murugan are called up to an island by Tony and his henchmen drops them there. Tony arrives and opens up to Eddy about his plans to kill Bilal and brothers, but Tony learns that his henchmen were bribed and are now against him. Asi reveals his grudge against Tony. Bilal arrives at the spot and kills Tony after a long fight. Tony is buried under the ditch by his men. After their mission, Eddy lives a happy and peaceful life with his family. Murugan spends time cheering with Rimy, while Bilal is seen helping the poor kids of their colony.

 Cast 

 Mammootty as Bilal John Kurishingal
 Manoj K Jayan as Eddy John Kurishingal
 Bala as Murugan John Kurishingal
 Sumit Naval as Bijo John Kurishingal
 Nafisa Ali as Mary John Kurishingal
 Pasupathy as ACP Balaji Sakthivel IPS
 Shereveer Vakil as Sayip Tony
 Innocent as Tommy Parekkadan, Rimi's Father
 Mamta Mohandas as Rimi Tommy, Murugan's love interest
 Lena as Celina, Eddy's wife
 Vijayaraghavan as CI George
 Maniyanpilla Raju as Dr. Venu
 Manasa as Bijo's love interest and Venu's daughter
 Ramesh Varma as Mayor
 Vinayakan as Pandi Asi, Tony's henchman
 Santhosh Jogi as Felix, Local goon and Tony's henchman
 Sreejith Ravi as Anthakaram Babu
 Paris Laxmi as Dancer in the song "Oh January"
 Jinu Joseph as Killer 1
 OG Sunil as Killer 2
 Jaffar Idukki as Dog Shamsu
 V. K. Sreeraman as Advocate
 Master Govind Nambiar as Abu
 Veena Nandakumar

Release
The film was released on 13 April 2007. The director announced a sequel to the film titled as Bilal in 2017. The film was dubbed in Tamil as Manik Baasha.

Reception
Though the film was an average grosser at the box office, it received critical acclaim and became a trendsetter in Malayalam cinema for its cinematography and making, along with the use of few dialogues, dark color tone and extensive use of slow-motion and background score, which redefines that an age-old mass action drama can be converted with a unique and fresh style. Mammootty gained lot of appraisal for his portrayal as Bilal'', which remains one his most memorable characters. He received the Best Actor award in the 10th Asianet Film Awards for his role in the film.

Soundtrack 

The songs were composed by Alphons Joseph, with lyrics penned by Jophy Tharakan and Santhosh Varma. The background score was composed by Gopi Sundar. Shreya Ghoshal sang her first song in Malayalam through this film. The song 'O January' is an unofficial cover of Shakira's Ojos Así.

References

External links 
 

2007 films
2000s Malayalam-language films
Films scored by Alphons Joseph
Films scored by Gopi Sundar
Films shot in Kochi
Indian gangster films
Films directed by Amal Neerad
Indian action thriller films